The French Roman Catholic diocese of Saint-Jean-de-Maurienne (San Giovanni di Moriana in Italian) has since 1966 been effectively suppressed, formally united with the archdiocese of Chambéry. While it has not been suppressed, and is supposed to be on a par with Chambéry and the diocese of Tarentaise, it no longer has a separate bishop or existence.

History 
 Saint Gregory of Tours's "De Gloria Martyrum" relates how the church of Maurienne, belonging then to the Diocese of Turin, became a place of pilgrimage, after the holy woman Thigris or Thecla, a native of Valloires, had brought to it as sacred relic from the East a finger of St. John the Baptist. Saint Guntram, King of Burgundy, took from the Lombards in 574 the valleys of Maurienne and Suse (Susa Valley, or Val de Suse), and in 576 founded near the shrine a bishopric, detached from the then Diocese of Turin (in Piedmont, northern Italy), as suffragan of the Archdiocese of Vienne, also comprising the Briançonnais. Its first bishop was Felmasius, known from a document on the Baptist relic's first miracle. In 599 Pope Gregory the Great failed to make the Merovingian Queen Brunhilda of Austrasia ('Brunehaut') oblige the protests of the Bishop of Turin against this foundation.
 Pope Leo III (795-816) made Darantasia (Tarantaise, Loire) a Metropolitan archbishopric with three suffragans, Aosta, Sion (=Sitten), and Maurienne, but maintained the Ancient primatial status of Vienne. A letter written by John VIII in 878 formally designated the Bishop of Maurienne as suffragan of Tarentaise, but for four centuries this supremacy was the cause of conflicts between the archbishops of Tarentaise and the Metropolitans of Vienna who continued to claim Maurienne as a suffragan see; subsequently under Callistus II (1120) Maurienne was again attached to the metropolis of Vienne.
 As its first see, a cathedral of John the Baptist was built in the 6th century, destroyed by invading Saracens in 943 and rebuilt in the 11th century.
 After the Saracens had been driven out, the temporal sovereignty of the Bishop of Maurienne appears to have been very extensive, but there is no proof that such sovereignty had been recognized since Gontran's time.
 At the death in 1032 of Rudolph III of Burgundy, the last ruler of the independent Kingdom of Burgundy, Bishop Thibaut was powerful enough to join a league against Holy Roman Emperor Conrad II of Franconia. In 1033 the city was destroyed by imperial troops and the bishopric lost part of its territory (the Susa valley) to the diocese of Turin, which was promised all. In 1038 the emperor suppressed the see of Maurienne altogether, giving over its title and possessions to the Bishops of Turin, but this imperial decree was never executed and at the death of Torino's bishop Guido in 1044, bishop Thibaud was fully reinstated at Maurienne.
 Emmanuel Philibert, Duke of Savoy, took solemn possession of a canonry in the cathedral of Maurienne in 1564.
 On 1801.11.29 the bishopric was suppressed, its territory being merged into the then Diocese of Chambéry.
 On 1825.08.07 it was restored as Diocese of Saint-Jean-de-Maurienne / Maurianen(sis) (Latin), on territory restituted from the now Metropolitan Archdiocese of Chambéry
 In 1947 it gained territory from the Metropolitan Archdiocese of Torino
 On 1966.04.26 it was suppressed as a see, its title and territory being merged into the accordingly renamed Metropolitan Archdiocese of Chambéry–Saint-Jean-de-Maurienne–Tarentaise.

Devotion 
Among the saints specially honoured in, or connected with, the diocese are: Saint Aper (Saint Avre), a priest who founded a refuge for pilgrims and the poor in the Village of St. Avre (seventh century); Blessed Thomas, b. at Maurienne, d. in 720, famous for rebuilding the Abbey of Farfa, of which the third abbot, Lucerius, was also a native of Maurienne; St. Marinus, monk of Chandor, martyred by the Saracens (eighth century); St. Landry, pastor of Lanslevillard (eleventh century), drowned in the Arc during one of his apostolic journeys; St. Bénézet, or Benoit de Pont (1165–84), b. at Hermillon in the diocese, and founder of the guild of Fratres Pontifices of Avignon; Blessed Cabert or Gabert, disciple of St. Dominic, who preached the Gospel for twenty years in the vicinity of AiguebelIe (thirteenth century).

The chief shrines of the diocese were: 
 Notre Dame de Bonne Nouvelle, near St-Jean-de-Maurienne, which dates from the sixteenth century
 Notre Dame de Charmaise, near Modane
 Notre Dame de Beaurevers at Montaimon, dating from the seventeenth century.

The Sisters of St. Joseph, a nursing and teaching order, with mother-house at St-Jean-de-Maurienne, are a branch of the Congregation of St. Joseph at Puy. At the end of the nineteenth century, they were in charge of 8 day nurseries and 2 hospitals. In Algeria, the East Indies and Argentina houses were founded, controlled by the motherhouse at Maurienne.

Episcopal ordinaries
Incomplete, several early inculebnts historically unsure
Suffragan Bishops of Saint-Jean-de-Maurienne
 579: Saint Felmase
 581–602: Saint Æconius (Hiconius)
 650: Leporius
 725: Walchinus
 c. 736 to 738: Saint Emilian of Cogolla, martyred by the Saracens (736 or 738)
 773: Vitgarius
 837: Mainard
 855: Joseph
 858: Abbo
 876: Adalbert
 899: Wilhelm I
 c. 915 Benedict
 916–926: Saint Odilard, slain by the Saracens (916) together with St. Benedict, Archbishop of Embrun
 994–1025: Evrard
 c. 1032–1060: Thibaud
 1060–1073: Brochard
 1075–1081: Artaud
 1081–1116: Conon
 1116–1124: Amédée de Faucigny
 1124–1132: Conon II
 1132–1134: Ayrald I, once a monk of the 
 1134–1146: Ayrald II
 1146–1158: Bernard I
 1158–1162: Ayrald III
 1162–1176: Guillaume II
 1177: Peter
 1177–1198: Lambert
 1198–1200: Allevard
 1200–1211: Bernard II
 1215 Amadeus of Genf
 1215–1221 Ean
 1221–1236 Aimar de Bernin
 1236–1256: Amadeus of Savoyen († 1268), son of Thomas I of Savoy
 1256–1261: Pierre de Morestel
 1261–1269: Anselm I de Clermont († 1269)
 1269–1273: Pierre de Guelis
 1273–1301: Aymon I de Miolans
 1302: Ayrald IV
 1302–1308: Amblard d’Entremont (de Beaumont)
 1308–1334: Aymon II de Miolans d’Hurtières
 1335–1349: Anselme II de Clermont († 1349)
 1349–1376: Amadeus of Savoyen-Achaia (also Bishop of Maurienne and Lausanne)
 1376–1380: Jean Malabaila
 1380–1385: Henry de Severy
 1385–1410: Savin de Floran
 1410–1422: Amédée de Montmayeur
 1422–1432: Aimon Gerbais
 1433–1441: Oger Moriset
 1441–1450?51: Cardinal Louis de La Pallud de Varembon, who as Bishop of Lausanne had taken an active part at the Council of Basle in favour of the antipope Felix V, who named him Bishop of Maurienne in 1441 and afterwards Cardinal, confirmed in both appointments by Pope Nicholas V in 1449
 1451–1452: Cardinal Juan de Segovia = John of Segovia, who at the Council of Basle as representative of the King of Aragon had also worked for pope Felix V, was appointed by him Cardinal in 1441, and whom pope Nicholas V gave ten years later the see of Maurienne; he is the author of "Gesta Concilii Basileensis" on the council
 1452–1483: Cardinal Guillaume d'Estouteville = William d'Estouteville (1473–80), who was made cardinal in 1439 and as a pluralist held among other titles those of Bishop of Angers, Lodève, Ostia, Porto and Archbishop of Rouen
 1483–1499: Etienne de Morel (also Abbot of Ambronay (Bresse))
 1499–1532: Cardinal Louis II de Gorrevod de Challand, made cardinal in 1530
 1532–1544: Louis III de Gorrevord
 1544–1559: Cardinal Jérôme Recanati Capodiferro or Testaferrata (also Bishop of Nizza)
 1560–1563: Brandolesius de Trottis
 1563–1567: Cardinal Ippolito II d'Este = Hippolyte d'Este (1560), made cardinal in 1538, acted as legate of Pius IV to the Council of Poissy, and built the famous Villa d'Este at Tivoli near Rome
 1567–1591: Pierre de Lambert
 1591–1618: Philibert François Milliet de Faverges
 1618–1636: Charles Bobba
 1640–1656: Paul Milliet de Challes
 1656–1686: Hercule Berzzeti
 1686–1736/41: François-Hyacinthe Valpergue de Masin 
 1741–1756: Ignace-Dominique Grisella de Rosignan
 1756–1778: Cardinal Charles-Joseph Filippa = Charles Joseph Fillipa de Martiniana, made cardinal in 1778, was the first to whom Napoleon I Bonaparte, after the battle of Marengo, confided his intention of concluding a concordat with Rome
 1780–1793: Charles-Joseph Compans de Brichanteau
 1802–1805: René des Monstiers de Mérinville (also Bishop of Chambéry and Genf)
 1805–1823: Irénée-Yves De Solle (also Bishop of Chambéry and Geneva=Genf)
 1825–1840: Cardinal Alexis Billiet (also Archbishop of Chambéry), made cardinal in 1861
 1840–1876: François-Marie Vibet
 1876–1906: Michel Rosset
 1906–1924: Adrien Alexis Fodéré
 1924–1946: Auguste Grumel
 1946–1954: Frédéric Duc
 1954–1956: Louis Ferrand (also coadjutor archbishop of Tours)
 1956–1960: Joël-André-Jean-Marie Bellec (also Bishop of Perpignan-Elne)
 1961–1966: André Georges Bontemps (also Archbishop of Chambéry)

See also 
 List of Catholic dioceses in France
 Catholic Church in France

Notes

Sources and external links 
 GCatholic, with Google satellite photo

 Bibliography
 pp. 548–549. (Use with caution; obsolete)
  p. 301. (in Latin)
 p. 175.

 p. 219.
 

 Jean-Barthélemy Hauréau, Gallia christiana, vol. XVI, Paris 1865, coll. 611-654
 Louis Duchesne, Fastes épiscopaux de l'ancienne Gaule, vol. I, Paris 1907, pp. 239–242
 Fedele Savio, Gli antichi vescovi d'Italia. Il Piemonte, Torino 1898, pp. 221–237

Former Roman Catholic dioceses in France
Dioceses established in the 6th century
Saint-Jean-de-Maurienne